The Royal Casket was a memorial created in 1800 by Izabela Czartoryska. The large wooden casket contained 73 precious relics that had once belonged to Polish royalty. The casket was inscribed: "Polish mementos assembled in 1800 by Izabela Czartoryska". It once reposed in the Temple of the Sibyl at Puławy.

Contents

The relics contained in the casket included:
 Portrait of Queen Constance of Austria in a silver dress made by King Sigismund III Vasa
 Silver rosary of Queen Marie Leszczyńska
 Ivory box in a silver gilded frame of King John III Sobieski
 Gold watch of Queen Marie Casimire
 Gold snuff-box decorated with diamonds and an enamel miniature of King Stanisław August Poniatowski
 Gold watch of King Augustus II
 Gold enameled chain of King John II Casimir
 Pectoral cross of King Sigismund the Old, made of red jasper in a gold frame with a gold chain
 Silver filigree cutlery of Prince Zygmunt Kazimierz
 Crystal watch in a gold frame of King Sigismund III Vasa
 Gold watch of King Stanisław Leszczyński
 Gold enameled pendant with "A" monogram and a gold chain of Anna Jagiellon
 Gold filigree chain of Queen Ludwika Maria Gonzaga, etc.

The casket survived all the confiscations after the collapses of the Polish national uprisings, because it had been moved to Kraków.

When World War II broke out, it was transported together with the rich collection of the Czartoryski Museum to Sieniawa and hidden in a repository, in a palace outbuilding, which was later bricked up. However, the German owner of a mill who worked for the Czartoryski family betrayed the hiding place to Wehrmacht soldiers, who entered Sieniawa on 14 September 1939. The soldiers broke into the palace and plundered the collection. They robbed the Royal Casket and distributed its contents among themselves.

Images

See also
 Polish Crown Jewels
 Czartoryski Museum
 Polish culture during World War II
 Nazi plunder

Notes

External links
 Department of National Heritage, Wartime losses
  Tajemnica Szkatuły Królewskiej

Crown jewels
Polish monarchy
Art and cultural repatriation
Germany–Poland relations